K2-18b, also known as EPIC 201912552 b, is an exoplanet orbiting the red dwarf K2-18, located  away from Earth. The planet, initially discovered with the Kepler space telescope, is about eight times the mass of Earth, and is thus classified as a super Earth or a Mini-Neptune, and, as well, may be considered a hycean planet. It has a 33-day orbit within the star's habitable zone.

In September 2019, two independent research studies, combining data from the Kepler space telescope, the Spitzer Space Telescope, and the Hubble Space Telescope, concluded that there are significant amounts of water vapor in its atmosphere, a first for an exoplanet in the habitable zone.

Discovery 
K2-18b was identified as part of the Kepler space telescope program, one of over 1,200 exoplanets discovered during the "Second Light" K2 mission. The planet was detected through variations in the star's light curve caused by the transit of the planet in front of the star as seen from Earth. The planet was designated "K2-18b" as it was the eighteenth planet discovered during the K2 mission. The predicted relatively low contrast between the planet and its host star would make it easier to observe K2-18b's atmosphere in the future.

In 2017, data from the Spitzer Space Telescope confirmed that K2-18b orbits in the habitable zone around K2-18 with a 33-day period, short enough to allow for observations of multiple K2-18b orbital cycles and improving the statistical significance of the signal. This led to widespread interest in continued observations of K2-18b.

Location 

K2-18 is in the constellation of Leo, but outside its lion asterism. When first discovered, K2-18's distance from Earth was estimated to be . This improved distance measurement helped to refine the properties of the exoplanetary system.

Physical characteristics 
The exoplanet has an orbital period of about 33 days, which suggests it is tidally locked, with the same face to its host star. It was initially considered a mini-Neptune on its 2015 discovery, but improved data on K2-18b has classified it as a super-Earth. A later study from 2019 classified the planet as a sub-Neptune.

Planetary atmosphere
A comparison of K2-18b's size, orbit, and other features to other detected exoplanets suggests that the planet could support an atmosphere that contains additional gases besides hydrogen and helium. 

Further studies using the Hubble Space Telescope were performed, corroborating the results of the Kepler and Spitzer observations and allowing additional measurements of the planet's atmosphere. Two separate analyses by researchers at Université de Montréal and University College London (UCL) of the Hubble data were published in 2019. Both examined spectra of starlight passing through the planet's atmosphere during transits, finding that K2-18b has a hydrogen–helium atmosphere with a high concentration of water vapor, which could range from between 0.01% to 12.5%, up to between 20% and 50%, depending on what other gaseous species are present in the atmosphere. At the upper concentration levels, the water vapor would be sufficiently high to form clouds. The UCL-led study was published on 11 September 2019 in the journal Nature Astronomy; the study led from the Université de Montréal was posted one day earlier on the preprint server arXiv.org and later published in The Astrophysical Journal Letters. The UCL-led analysis detected water with a statistical significance of 3.6 standard deviations, equivalent to a confidence level of 99.97%.

This was the first super-Earth exoplanet within a star's habitable zone whose atmosphere was detected, and the first discovery of water in a habitable-zone exoplanet. Water had previously been detected in the atmospheres of non-habitable-zone exoplanets such as HD 209458 b, XO-1b, WASP-12b, WASP-17b, and WASP-19b.

Astronomers emphasised that the discovery of water in the atmosphere of K2-18b does not mean the planet can support life or is even habitable, as it probably lacks any solid surface or an atmosphere that can support life. Nevertheless, finding water in a habitable zone exoplanet helps understand how planets are formed. A study led by astronomers from the University of Cambridge considered the interior structure of the planet and found a range of possible solutions, from a rocky core with a thick hydrogen envelope to a planet primarily made up of water with a thinner atmosphere. A subset of these solutions could allow for liquid water on the surface of the planet, albeit at temperatures and pressures higher than STP. K2-18b is now expected to be observed with the James Webb Space Telescope, launched in 2021, and the ARIEL space telescope, due to launch in 2029. Both will carry instruments designed to determine the composition of exoplanet atmospheres.

The detailed simulation of planetary spectrum in 2020 has indicated the 1.4 µm absorption band attributed previously to water may actually be due to methane. The water vapor spectral signatures would not be dominant for cool (below 600 K) planets. In 2021, it was further deemed the alleged water absorption spectral feature may be coming from time-variable star spots of the parent star, not from the planetary atmosphere.

See also

References

External links 

K2-18 b Confirmed Planet Overview Page, NASA Exoplanet Archive

Exoplanets discovered in 2015
Transiting exoplanets
Super-Earths in the habitable zone
Exoplanets in the habitable zone
1
Leo (constellation)
Extraterrestrial water